Ruyang County is a county in the west of Henan province, China, under the jurisdiction of the prefecture-level city of Luoyang.

Ruyang County has been the site of several major discoveries of fossilized dinosaur bones, including Huanghetitan ruyangensis, which was first described in 2007.

Administrative divisions
As 2012, this county is divided to 4 towns and 9 townships.
Towns

Townships

Climate

References

External links
Article about dinosaur finds in Ruyang County
Article about dinosaur finds in Ruyang County
Article about dinosaur finds in Ruyang County
Ruyang County official site (Chinese)

County-level divisions of Henan
Luoyang